Camerino Without a Folding Screen (Spanish:Camerino sin biombo) is a 1967 Spanish drama film directed by José María Zabalza and starring Paloma Valdés, Gemma Cuervo and Carmen Lozano. It portrays the lives of three women who work in a rough nightclub.

Cast
 Blaki 
 Germán Cobos 
 Gemma Cuervo 
 E. Escalante  
 Antonio Escales 
 Carmen Lozano 
 Manuel Manzaneque as Narrator 
 A. Uruñuela  
 Paloma Valdés

References

Bibliography
 Peter Cowie & Derek Elley. World Filmography: 1967. Fairleigh Dickinson University Press, 1977.

External links 

1967 films
1967 drama films
Spanish drama films
1960s Spanish-language films
Films directed by José María Zabalza
1960s Spanish films